United States Army soldier Tracie Joy McBride was kidnapped, raped, and murdered on February 18, 1995. Louis Jones Jr., a former soldier and Gulf War veteran, was tried and convicted in the U.S. federal court system for kidnapping resulting in death. The crime was a federal case since it started on a military base, and the rape was the prime aspect to the murder which made it a capital offense. Jones, who was sentenced to death, argued that he should be spared execution due to the traumatic effects of Gulf War syndrome. His appeals were unsuccessful and he was executed by lethal injection in 2003.

Mark Miller of Newsweek characterized the Jones case as unusual due to the Gulf War syndrome defense strategy.

Crime
On February 18, 1995, 44-year old Louis Jones drove onto Goodfellow Air Force Base in San Angelo, Texas, and kidnapped Private Tracie Joy McBride, a 19-year old from Centerville, Minnesota. Jones was looking for his ex-wife, but instead decided to kidnap McBride. McBride was on the telephone with a friend, and in a laundry facility when she was abducted. Two privates attempted to rescue McBride, but Jones rendered one, Private Michael Peacock, unconscious by hitting him.

Jones took McBride to his house, raped her, and held her in a closet. He forced McBride to use hydrogen peroxide on herself, washed McBride's clothes, and forced McBride to walk on towels; these efforts were part of an attempt to conceal the crime by hiding any fibers and other possible evidence. He then drove McBride to a remote area and beat her to death with a tire iron. McBride had been hit in the head at least nine times. Dr. Jan Garavaglia, who was at the time of the murder an associate medical examiner in Bexar County, examined McBride's body at a local morgue. Garavaglia stated that the trauma to her head was "worse than most high-impact car wrecks." Jones likely forced McBride to walk to the point where she was killed; only mud was found on her boots, and no scuff marks were present. McBride's body was found clothed in her U.S. Army battle uniform, itself in excellent condition; the clothing had no forensic evidence of rape. The undergarments were not present.

Jones was arrested on March 1 by the San Angelo Police Department for sexually assaulting his ex-wife, Staff Sergeant Sandra Lane, after she filed a complaint with the Air Force's Office of Special Investigations (OSI). OSI agents made an inquiry to Jones on whether he was involved in McBride's abduction, and Jones confessed to killing her; he then led authorities to McBride's body. Initially, Jones stated that he did not rape McBride. McBride's body was autopsied by Garavaglia at the Bexar County Forensic Science Center in San Antonio, Texas. Due to the unusually cool weather and the placement of the body under a bridge, the body was well preserved.  Despite Jones' efforts to conceal the rape, Garavaglia was able to determine that Jones had raped McBride, and this fact allowed federal prosecutors to ask for the death penalty. Jones later confessed to a psychiatrist to raping McBride.

Background

Louis Jones Jr.
Jones, born on March 4, 1950, was a native of Shelby County, Tennessee, and grew up in Chicago. According to testimony presented at his criminal trial, Jones experienced sexual and physical abuse.

He served in the Army for 22 years. Richard A. Serrano of the Los Angeles Times wrote, "It was in the Army where he excelled." Jones, a member of the U.S. Army Rangers, participated in the Invasion of Grenada and the Gulf War of 1991. He was the leader of a platoon in Grenada, and he received a Commendation Medal due to his actions during a ground attack in Iraq. He became a master sergeant and on his retirement in 1993 was honorably discharged from the Rangers. At the time of the crime, he worked on base as a bus driver.

Jones was married three times, and he had a daughter, Barbara; he raised her as a single parent. One of his wives, Sandra Lane, was an Army staff sergeant. He became estranged from her; she noted changes in his behavior after he returned from Iraq. Jones had no previous criminal record. Before the killing, he worked low-paying jobs and received low grades in university courses. Lane filed an official complaint with the OSI on March 1, 1995, stating that, on February 16 of that year, Jones had kidnapped her, made her take money out of her bank account, and committed sexual assault against her while at his residence.

Tracie McBride
Tracie Joy McBride (May 27, 1975 – February 19, 1995), a graduate of Centennial High School in Circle Pines, Minnesota, was at the base for advanced intelligence training for a two-week period. McBride aspired to become a music teacher. McBride joined the United States Army after her high school graduation, intending to fund her university education; she hoped to have her degree completed prior to the end of her tour of duty. At the end of her life, McBride was in a romantic relationship with a member of the U.S. Marines. She was assigned to Goodfellow in early February 1995 after completion of training, at the Defense Language Institute at the Presidio of Monterey in Monterey, California. McBride was kidnapped 10 days after her arrival.

Trial, appeals, and penalty

Jones, indicted in March 1995, was tried in federal court in Lubbock, Texas, since he had kidnapped McBride from a military base. His specific charge was "kidnapping within special maritime/territorial jurisdiction resulting in death". U.S. Attorney Tanya K. Pierce was the prosecutor. McBride's family supported the prosecutor's decision to seek the death penalty for Jones. The trial was moved from San Angelo to Lubbock due to the news coverage in the former city.

The trial began on October16, 1995. Nine members of the twelve-person jury were female and the rest were male. Jones stated that he committed the crime due to trauma he received during his military duties, indicative of Gulf War syndrome. Evidence showing brain damage to Jones was presented. Jones was convicted on October23, after two days of testimony and 65 minutes of deliberation from the jury. After finding that Jones had intentionally killed McBride, the jury proceeded to sentencing.

The sentencing phase involved the jury deliberating for 6.5 hours. The prosecution alleged four statutory aggravating circumstances and three non-statutory aggravating circumstances. The jury unanimously found two statutory aggravating circumstances: Jones killed McBride during the commission of a kidnapping and the murder involved torture or serious physical abuse to McBride, referring to the rape. The finding of statutory aggravating circumstances officially made the McBride's murder a capital offense. The jury rejected two other alleged statutory aggravating circumstances: Jones had knowingly put lives other than that of McBride at risk and the murder was premeditated. As for non-statutory aggravating circumstances, the jury unanimously found that McBride's family had suffered from her death and that McBride was vulnerable due to her young age and other characteristics, but rejected the argument that Jones would present a future danger.

The defense presented 11 mitigating circumstances, which a varying number of jurors agreed upon:

 Jones did not have a significant prior criminal record (6)
 Jones's capacity to appreciate the wrongfulness of the his actions were significantly impaired, regardless of whether the capacity was so impaired as to constitute a defense to the charge (2)
 Jones committed the murder under severe mental or emotional disturbance (1)
 Jones suffered physical, sexual, and emotional abuse as a child (4)
 Jones's military service (8)
 Jones would not be a problematic inmate (3)
 Jones is remorseful (4)
 Jones's daughter (9)
 Jones was under a great deal of duress and/or stress at the time of the murder (3)
 Jones suffered from numerous neurological or psychological disorders (1)
 Other factors in the Jones's background or character mitigate against a verdict of death (0)

In addition, seven jurors found that the testimony of Jones's ex-wife, Sandra Lane, was a mitigating factor. Although Lane testified that Jones raped her in his apartment two days before he killed McBride, she also said that he seemed "very crazed" and was "spinning out of control, bouncing from thought to thought."

On November 3, 1995, the jury came back with a unanimous recommendation for death. On June 11, 1996, Jones was entered into the Texas Department of Criminal Justice (TDCJ) as prisoner #999195 under an agreement with federal authorities. The State of Texas housed its male death-row inmates at the Ellis Unit near Huntsville, Texas. On July 13, 1999, he was moved into federal custody, to the newly opened men's death row at U.S. Penitentiary, Terre Haute. He was Federal Bureau of Prisons (BOP) prisoner #27265-077.

Throughout the appeals process, Jones' lawyer, Tim Floyd, continued to argue that he should be spared the death penalty and have his sentence commuted to life imprisonment because nerve gas from Iraq had damaged Jones' brain. Floyd contacted University of Texas Southwestern Medical Center epidemiology department head, Dr. Robert Haley, who published the first major studies related to Gulf War syndrome, and asked him to review his client's medical records; Haley argued that Jones had sustained brain damage and that it "was responsible for the personality changes that contributed significantly to the tragic events of his crime." U.S. senator Kay Bailey Hutchison argued that Jones should have his brain scanned to check for any damage before any death sentence would be carried out. Ross Perot also called for a commutation of the sentence to life without parole. Throughout the appeal process, McBride's family advocated for Jones' execution.

In 1998, the United States Court of Appeals for the Fifth Circuit found that two of the non-statutory aggravating circumstances appeared to be redundant. However, they upheld the death sentence since they found that the aggravation still outweighed the mitigation.

In 1999, the U.S. Supreme Court declined to overturn Jones' death sentence. Jones' final appeal for clemency from then-president of the United States GeorgeW. Bush and his final appeal at the U.S. Supreme Court failed on March17, 2003. On March18, 2003, Jones was executed at USP Terre Haute, making him the third federal prisoner executed since federal executions resumed in 2001. McBride's family and a friend attended the execution.

After Jones's execution, his attorney read a written statement from him: "I accept full responsibility for the pain, anguish and the suffering I caused the McBrides for having taken Tracie from them." He said he would not ask "for forgiveness for the awful things done to Tracie. They continue to feel anguish and pain that will always be felt by them, and I felt forgiveness from the McBrides is something I had no right to ask for."

Jones remained the last person executed by the United States federal government until July14, 2020, when Daniel Lewis Lee was executed by lethal injection.

Legacy
McBride was buried at Fort Snelling National Cemetery in Minnesota. The Tracie Joy McBride Scholarship Fund and its associated event, Tracie's Night, were named after her; the fund is primarily managed by her sister, Stacie McBride-Cox.

The episode "Life Interrupted" of the television show Dr. G: Medical Examiner, first aired in 2007, describes this case.

In Human Behavior in the Social Environment: A Macro, National, and International Perspective, author Rudolph Alexander Jr. wrote that experiences of soldiers during the 2000s Iraq War, in which over 3,700 coming back from the war in 2005 stated that they had fears that they may lose control of themselves or harm another person and that 1,700 reported believing that they believed they were better off dead and considered hurting themselves, "provide support for Jones' claims." 450,000 Americans served in the Gulf War.

See also

 Capital punishment by the United States federal government
 Capital punishment in the United States
 List of people executed by the United States federal government
 List of people executed in the United States in 2003
 List of solved missing person cases
 Killing of Vanessa Guillén

References

Further reading

External links
Legal documents
 JONES V. UNITED STATES (97-9361) 527 U.S. 373 (1999)
 Jones v. United States 97 U.S. 9361 (1999) Supreme Court of the United States decision.
 UNITED STATES COURT OF APPEALS FOR THE FIFTH CIRCUIT No. 01-10142 UNITED STATES OF AMERICA, Plaintiff - Appellee, VERSUS LOUIS JONES, Defendant - Appellant. (Archive)
Other links
 Tracie Joy McBride Scholarship Fund
 

1990s missing person cases
1995 in Texas
1995 murders in the United States
Coke County, Texas
Crimes in Texas
Deaths by person in Texas
February 1995 crimes
February 1995 events in the United States
Female murder victims
Formerly missing people
Kidnapped people
Missing person cases in Texas
Murder in Texas
Violence against women in the United States
San Angelo, Texas
History of women in Texas
Kidnappings in the United States
Capital murder cases